Biological is the adjectival form of "biology", the study of life. Biological may also refer to:

Biological agent, an infectious disease or toxin that can be used in bioterrorism or biological warfare
Biological process
Biological relationship, a measure of the degree of consanguinity

See also 
Biologic (disambiguation)
Biological material (disambiguation)
Biological warfare
Biopharmaceutical, a drug that is synthesized from living organisms or their products and used as a medical treatment
Organic (disambiguation)